The 2010 AFF Futsal Championship was held in Ho Chi Minh City, Vietnam from 5 April to 11 April 2010.

Defending champions Thailand did not take part at this tournament as they opted to play in the Thai 5s which was being held around the same time in Udon Thani.

Hosts Vietnam having already qualified for the 2010 AFC Futsal Championship, were targeting top spot at this edition of the AFF Futsal Championship.

Tournament 
All times are Indochina Time (ICT) - UTC+7

Group stage

Final

Winner

Goalscorers 

6 goals
 Misagh Bahadoran

4 goals
 Hairul Saleh Ohorella
 Socrates Matulessy

3 goals
 Vennard Hutabarat
 Mohd Khairul Effendy Mohd Bahrin
 Truong Quoc Tuan

2 goals
 Indra Kurnia
 Sayan Karmadi
 Jaelani Ladjanibi
 Deny Handoyo
 Mohd Ali Mahat
 Ruzaley AbduL Aziz
 Aye Min Win
 Ariel Zerrudo
 Ha Bao Minh
 Nguyen Bao Quan
 Nguyen Quoc Bao
 Huynh Ba Tuan

1 goal
 Angga Saputra
 Ali Haidar
 Karismawan
 Qaiser Abdul Kadir
 S. Devandran
 Htein Lin
 Han Naing Soe
 Aung Thu
 Nguyen Hoang Giang
 Ngo Anh Dung

Own goal
 Misagh Bahadoran (for Indonesia)
 Dang Phuoc Anh (for Indonesia)

References 
General
"8th AFF Futsal Championship" Futsal Planet.

Specific

External links
 Old website (Archived)
 Official website

AFF Futsal Championship
AFF Futsal
2010
Fut
2010  in Asian futsal